Bijie is a prefecture-level city in northwestern Guizhou Province, China, bordering Sichuan to the north and Yunnan to the west.

The Daotianhe Reservoir, located to the north of the town was commissioned in 1965 with a rated annual capacity of 6.5 million cubic meters.

On 10 November 2011, the former Bijie Prefecture was converted to a prefecture-level city, and the former county-level city of Bijie was rechristened Qixingguan District.

Geography and climate 

Bijie borders Zunyi to the east, Anshun and Liupanshui to the south, Zhaotong and Qujing (Yunnan) to the west, and Luzhou (Sichuan) to the north. It spans latitude 26°21′−27°46′ N and longitude 105°36′−106°43′ E, and is marked heavily by the presence of the Wumeng Mountains as well as karst topography. The Wu, Beipan, and Chishui Rivers are the most important rivers that originate here.

Due to its low latitude and elevation above , Bijie has a monsoon-influenced subtropical highland climate (Köppen Cwb), bordering on a humid subtropical climate (Köppen Cwa) with very warm, rainy summers and cool, damp winters. Rainfall is very common year-round, occurring on 206 days of the year, but over half of the annual total occurs from June to August. With monthly percent possible sunshine ranging from 15% in January to 44% in August, the city receives 1,218 hours of bright sunshine annually; spring is sunnier and features warmer daytime temperatures than autumn.

Administration 

Bijie City consists of one district, one county-level city, five counties and one autonomous county. These are:

 Qixingguan District;
 Qianxi City;
 Dafang County;
 Jinsha County;
 Zhijin County;
 Nayong County;
 Hezhang County;
 Weining Yi Hui and Miao Autonomous County.

Demographics 

According to the 2010 Sixth National Census, Bijie City had a permanent resident population of 6,536,370, an increase of 208,899 (3.3% or 0.33% annually), 3,400,195 (52.02%) of which were male, producing a male-female ratio of 108.42:100. Children aged 0−14 numbered 2,029,934人 (31.06%), persons aged 15−64 numbered 4,018,583 (61.48), and seniors 65+ numbered 487,853 (7.46%). The urban population stood at 1,711,222 (26.18%). Persons of Han ethnicity numbered 4,824,015 (73.80%), while minorities formed the other 26.20%.

Transport 
At present the backbone of the transport network in Bijie City is formed by China National Highways 321 and 326. , Bijie is the only prefecture-level city of Guizhou to lack rail service; this changed with the 2020 opening of the Leshan (Sichuan)−Guiyang Railway. Other projected rail lines are Bijie−Shuicheng−Xingyi and Zhaotong (Yunnan)−Weining−Bijie−Jinsha−Zunyi. The city is served by the Bijie Feixiong Airport .

Historical sites 
Notable historical sites in Bijie include the following:

Historical inscriptions
Ma'an Mountain, Qianxi Yi Cliff Inscription: located in Bakuaitian, Chengguan Township, Qianxi
Wopo, Hezhang Cliff Inscription: located in Xique, Wopo Township, Hezhang
Qixingguan, Bijie Cliff Inscription: located in Qixing Township, along the border between Hezhang County and Qixingguan District
Chekaiqing, Nayong Chinese-Yi Cliff Inscription: located in Kaiqing, Poqi Township, Zhikun District
Guanyindong, Jinsha Buddha Image Cliff Inscription: located in Yankong, near the local elementary school
Qianxi "Reverse Cliff Inscription": located in Zhongguan, Zhongjian Township
Dafang Shuixi Dadu River Bridge Inscription: located on the banks of the Dadu River between Huangnitang, Dafang County, and Aoshui Township, Qianxi County
Dafang Hejia Bridge Yi Inscription: located on the banks of the Mudu River in Shishu Township
Dafang Mayi River Bridge Inscription: located on the Mayi River Bridge in Songhe Township
Dafang Yi Ancestral Origin Inscription: located in Qingjiao, Shishu Township

References

External links 
 Official government website of Bijie City

 
Cities in Guizhou
Prefecture-level divisions of Guizhou